In enzymology, an aromatic-hydroxylamine O-acetyltransferase is an enzyme that catalyzes the chemical reaction

N-hydroxy-4-acetylaminobiphenyl + N-hydroxy-4-aminobiphenyl  N-hydroxy-4-aminobiphenyl + N-acetoxy-4-aminobiphenyl

Thus, the two substrates of this enzyme are N-hydroxy-4-acetylaminobiphenyl and N-hydroxy-4-aminobiphenyl, whereas its two products are N-hydroxy-4-aminobiphenyl and N-acetoxy-4-aminobiphenyl.

This enzyme belongs to the family of transferases, specifically those acyltransferases transferring groups other than aminoacyl groups.  The systematic name of this enzyme class is N-hydroxy-4-acetylaminobiphenyl:N-hydroxy-4-aminobiphenyl O-acetyltransferase. Other names in common use include aromatic hydroxylamine acetyltransferase, arylhydroxamate acyltransferase, arylhydroxamate N,O-acetyltransferase, arylhydroxamic acid N,O-acetyltransferase, arylhydroxamic acyltransferase, N,O-acetyltransferase, and N-hydroxy-2-acetylaminofluorene N-O acyltransferase.

References

 

EC 2.3.1
Enzymes of unknown structure